Silverman v. Campbell was a South Carolina Supreme Court case regarding the constitutionality of a provision in the South Carolina Constitution requiring an oath to God for employment in the public sector.

Details
In 1992, Herb Silverman was a mathematics professor at the College of Charleston who applied to become a notary public. Silverman had earlier run for the post of Governor of South Carolina. Silverman declared himself an Atheist but also joined a Unitarian Church. His application was rejected after he crossed off the phrase "So help me God"  from the oath, which was required by the South Carolina State Constitution. Silverman filed a lawsuit naming Governor Carroll Campbell and Secretary of State Jim Miles as defendants. After a lower court made a ruling in favor of Silverman,  the state appealed to the Supreme Court contending that the case was not about religion.

The South Carolina Supreme Court, in a unanimous decision, ruled that Article VI, section 2 and Article XVII, section 4 of the South Carolina Constitution—both of which state, "No person who denies the existence of a Supreme Being shall hold any office under this Constitution"—could not be enforced because they violated the First Amendment protection of free exercise of religion and the Article VI, section 3 of the United States Constitution banning the use of a religious test for public office. Current precedent holds that these provisions are binding on the states under the 14th Amendment.

See also
Torcaso v. Watkins (a similar case in Maryland)
 Secular Coalition for America, an atheist advocacy group founded by Silverman

References

1997 in United States case law
South Carolina state case law
Atheism in the United States
Religious controversies in the United States
Establishment Clause case law
1997 in South Carolina
Religion in South Carolina
1997 in religion